Vilson Džoni (born 24 September 1950) is a Croatian retired footballer, who played as a defender. He was named Yugoslav Footballer of the Year in 1978.

Club career
Džoni was born in Split to a family from Prizren, and is of Kosovo Albanian descent.
He was a full back whose biggest weapon was his speed. At club level, he spent 10 years at Hajduk Split playing a total of 207 league games. He then moved to Dinamo Zagreb, where he spent just one year before moving to FC Schalke 04.

International career
He made his debut for Yugoslavia in a September 1974 friendly match against Italy and earned a total of 4 caps, scoring no goals. His final international was a November 1978 Balkan Cup match against Greece.

Post-playing career
He worked as a scout within Croatian First League's Hajduk Split until he retired in 2015.

References

External links
 

1950 births
Living people
Footballers from Split, Croatia
Croatian people of Kosovan descent
Croatian people of Albanian descent
Association football fullbacks
Yugoslav footballers
Yugoslavia international footballers
HNK Hajduk Split players
GNK Dinamo Zagreb players
FC Schalke 04 players
SG Wattenscheid 09 players
Yugoslav First League players
Bundesliga players
2. Bundesliga players
Yugoslav expatriate footballers
Expatriate footballers in West Germany
Yugoslav expatriate sportspeople in West Germany
HNK Hajduk Split non-playing staff